The Pass Peak Formation is a Wasatchian geologic formation in Wyoming. It preserves fossils dating back to the Ypresian stage of the Eocene period.

Fossil content 
The following fossils have been found in the formation:

Mammals 
Artiodactyls
 Diacodexis sp.
Erinaceomorpha
 Diacodon celatus
Glires
 Paramys copei
Macroscelidea
 Adapisoricidae indet.
Perissodactyla
 Hyracotherium cf. vasacciense
Placentalia
 Hyopsodus cf. wortmani

Wasatchian correlations

See also 
 List of fossiliferous stratigraphic units in Wyoming
 Paleontology in Wyoming

References

Bibliography 
 

Geologic formations of Wyoming
Eocene Series of North America
Paleogene geology of Wyoming
Ypresian Stage
Wasatchian
Paleontology in Wyoming